The University of Iowa College of Engineering is one of twelve academic colleges in The University of Iowa.

The college is composed of six departments: biomedical, chemical and biochemical, civil and environmental, electrical and computer, industrial and systems, and mechanical engineering. The college offers training leading to bachelor's, master's, and doctoral degrees.

Eight alumni are members of the National Academy of Engineering.

References

External links 
 

Engineering schools and colleges in the United States
University of Iowa
1904 establishments in Iowa
Educational institutions established in 1904